Josipović is a Croatian surname, a patronymic derived from Josip (English equivalent Joseph). and may refer to:

 Aleksandar Josipović, a French artist 
 Anton Josipović, a Bosnia and Herzegovina boxer
 Emerik Josipović, a Croatian politician
 Gejza Josipović, a Croatian politician
 Ivo Josipović, President of Croatia, legal scholar and composer

See also
Josifović, Serbian variant
Jusufović, Bosniak variant

Croatian surnames
Patronymic surnames